Everyone may refer to:

Television
 "Everyone" (Skins series 1), episode 9 of series 1 of Skins
 "Everyone", episode 1 of series 3 of Skins
 "Everyone", episode 8 of series 4 of Skins
 "Everyone" (Skins series 5), episode 8 of series 5 of Skins
 "Everyone", episode 1 of series 6 of Skins

Music
 "Everyone" (Olympics song), official theme song of the 2010 Summer Youth Olympics
 "Everyone" (Van Morrison song)
 "Everyone", a song by Adema from Adema
 "Everyone", a song by Backstreet Boys from Black & Blue

Other
 Everyone (film), a 2004 Canadian film directed by Bill Marchant
 Everyone, a rating from the Entertainment Software Rating Board for video games

See also 
 Everybody (disambiguation)
 Indefinite pronoun